Sir Edward Wardour (died 14 March 1645/6) was an English office holder and politician who sat in the House of Commons between 1621 and 1625.

Wardour was a native a Malmesbury and held the office of Clerk of the Pells.<ref name=Ruigh>Robert E. Ruigh The Parliament of 1624: politics and foreign policy</]</ref> He was knighted by the King at Whitehall on 20 July 1618. In 1621, he  was elected Member of Parliament for Malmesbury. He was re-elected MP for Malmesbury in 1624 and 1625. 
 
Wardour died in 1646 and was buried at All Saints Church, Oxford.

Wardour married Jane Bowdler, who died on 20 January 1652 and was buried by him.

References

Year of birth missing
1646 deaths
English MPs 1621–1622
English MPs 1624–1625
English MPs 1625